Island is the fifth studio album by Canadian artist Owen Pallett. It was released on May 22, 2020, by Domino Recording Company.

The album was a longlisted nominee for the 2020 Polaris Prize.

Critical reception

Island was met with widespread acclaim reviews from critics.  Chris Gee of The Exclaim! reviewed "Island is a record that exists in a lavish fantasy world built upon identity struggles and perfectly ripe orchestrations – qualities we have come to expect from the multi-instrumentalist."

Track listing
All tracks written by Owen Pallett.

References

2020 albums
Owen Pallett albums
Domino Recording Company albums